Bernice Pillemer is a former Israeli international lawn bowler.

Bowls career
Pillemer won a bronze medal in the fours with Edith Silverman, Molly Skudowitz, Helen Gordon and Rina Lebel at the 1981 World Outdoor Bowls Championship in Toronto.

References

Israeli female bowls players
Living people
Year of birth missing (living people)